Ohad ( or ) is a moshav in southern Israel. Located in the Hevel Eshkol area of the north-western Negev desert near the Gaza Strip border, it falls under the jurisdiction of Eshkol Regional Council.

History
Founded in 1969 by Olim from various countries, it is named after Ohad, the third son of Shim'om (Simeon), mentioned in the Bible (Genesis 46:10), with the neighbouring communal settlement Tzohar named after his brother, mentioned in the same biblical verse.

References

Moshavim
Populated places established in 1969
Gaza envelope
Populated places in Southern District (Israel)
1969 establishments in Israel